The Hail Mary or Angelical salutation is a traditional Christian prayer addressing Mary, the mother of Jesus. The prayer is based on two biblical passages featured in the Gospel of Luke: the Angel Gabriel's visit to Mary (the Annunciation) and Mary's subsequent visit to Elisabeth, the mother of John the Baptist (the Visitation). It is also called Angelical salutation as the prayer is based on the Archangel Gabriel's words to Mary. The Hail Mary is a prayer of praise for and of petition to Mary, regarded as the Theotokos (Mother of God). Since the 16th century, the version of the prayer used in the Catholic Church closes with an appeal for her intercession. The prayer takes different forms in various traditions and has often been set to music. 

In the Latin Church, the Hail Mary forms the basis of other prayers such as the Angelus and the Rosary. In the psalmody of the Oriental Orthodox Churches a daily Theotokion is devoted to ascribing praise to the Mother of God. The Eastern Orthodox Churches have apart from the Theotokion a quite similar prayer to the Hail Mary (without explicit request for the intercession of Mary), both in Greek and in translations, for frequent private prayer. The Eastern Catholic Churches follow their respective traditions or adopt the Latin Church version, which is also used by many other Western groups historically associated with the Catholic Church, such as Lutherans, Anglicans, Independent Catholics, and Old Catholics.

Biblical source
The prayer incorporates two greetings to Mary recorded in the Gospel of Luke: "Hail, full of grace, the Lord is with thee", and "Blessed art thou amongst women and blessed is the fruit of thy womb". In mid-13th-century Western Europe, the prayer consisted only of these words with the single addition of the name "Mary" after the word "Hail", as is evident from Thomas Aquinas's commentary on the prayer.

The first of the two passages from the Gospel of Luke is the greeting of the Angel Gabriel to Mary, originally written in Koine Greek. This was the normal greeting in the language in which the Gospel of Luke is written and continues to be used in the same sense in Modern Greek. Accordingly, both "hail" and "rejoice" are valid English translations of the word ("hail" reflecting the Latin translation, and "rejoice" reflecting the original Greek).

The word , here translated as "graceful ", admits of various translations. Grammatically, the word is the feminine perfect passive participle of the verb , which means "to show, or bestow with, grace" and here, in the passive voice, "to have grace shown, or bestowed upon, one".

The text also appears in the account of the annunciation contained in chapter 9 of the apocryphal Infancy Gospel of Matthew.

The second part of the prayer is taken from Elizabeth's greeting to Mary as recorded in Luke 1:42: "Blessed art thou among women, and blessed is the fruit of thy womb." Taken together, these two passages are the two times Mary is greeted in chapter 1 of the Gospel of Luke.

In Western (Latin) tradition

After considering the use of similar words in Syriac, Greek and Latin in the 6th century, Herbert Thurston, writing in the Catholic Encyclopedia concludes that "there is little or no trace of the Hail Mary as an accepted devotional formula before about 1050" – though a later pious tale attributed to Ildephonsus of Toledo (fl. 7th century) the use of the first part, namely the angel's greeting to Mary, without that of Elizabeth, as a prayer. All the evidence suggests that it took its rise from certain versicles and responsories occurring in the Little Office of the Blessed Virgin Mary, which just at that time was coming into favour among the monastic orders.

Thomas Aquinas spoke of the name "Mary" as the only word added at his time to the Biblical text, to indicate the person who was "full of grace." But at about the same time the name "Jesus" was also added, to specify who was meant by the phrase "the fruit of thy womb".

The Western version of the prayer is thus not derived from the Greek version: even the earliest Western forms have no trace of the Greek version's phrases: "Mother of God and Virgin" and "for thou hast given birth to the Saviour of our souls."

To the greeting and praise of Mary of which the prayer thus consisted, a petition "Holy Mary, Mother of God, pray for us sinners now and at the hour of our death" was added later. The petition first appeared in print in 1495 in Girolamo Savonarola's . The "Hail Mary" prayer in Savonarola's exposition reads: "Hail Mary, full of grace, the Lord is with thee; blessed art thou amongst women, and blessed is the fruit of thy womb, Jesus. Holy Mary, Mother of God, pray for us sinners, now and at the hour of our death. Amen."

The petition was commonly added around the time of the Council of Trent. The Dutch Jesuit Petrus Canisius is credited with adding in 1555 in his Catechism the sentence

Eleven years later, the sentence was included in the Catechism of the Council of Trent of 1566. The catechism says that to the first part of the Hail Mary, by which "we render to God the highest praise and return Him most gracious thanks, because He has bestowed all His heavenly gifts on the most holy Virgin ... the Church of God has wisely added prayers and an invocation addressed to the most holy Mother of God. ...We should earnestly implore her help and assistance; for that she possesses exalted merits with God, and that she is most desirous to assist us by her prayers, no one can doubt without impiety and wickedness." Soon after, in 1568 Pope Pius V included the full form as now known in his revision of the Roman Breviary.

The current Latin version is thus as follows, with accents added to indicate how the prayer is said in the current ecclesiastical pronunciation of Latin, as well as macrons to indicate the Classical vowel lengths:

Because recitation of the Angelus, a prayer within which the Hail Mary is recited three times, is usually accompanied by the ringing of the Angelus bell, words from the Ave Maria were often inscribed on bells.

Byzantine Christian use
The Hail Mary prayer of the Eastern Orthodox Church and Byzantine Rite Catholic Churches is similar to the first part of the Latin Church form, with the addition of a very brief opening phrase and a short concluding phrase. It is well known and often used, though not quite as frequently as in the Western Church. It appears in several canons of prayer. It is typically sung thrice at the end of Vespers during an All-Night Vigil, and occurs many times in the course of daily prayer.

The Greek text, of which those in other languages are translations, is:

To the Biblical texts this adds the opening invocation "Theotokos Virgin", the name "Mary", and the concluding phrase "because it was the Saviour of our souls that thou borest".

Another English rendering of the same text reads:

or:

Slavonic versions
There exist two variant versions in Church Slavonic:

The first is the older, and remains in use by the Old Believers as well as those who follow the Ruthenian recension (among them the Ukrainian Greek-Catholic Church and the Ruthenian Catholic Church). The second, corresponding more closely to the Greek, appeared in 1656 under the liturgical reforms of Patriarch Nikon of Moscow, and is in use by the Russian Orthodox Church, the Serbian Orthodox Church, the Bulgarian Orthodox Church and the Ukrainian Orthodox Church.

Latin Church Catholic use
The Hail Mary is the last prayer in Appendix V of the Roman Missal, the last of seven prayers under the heading "Thanksgiving After Mass". There it appears with "with you" instead of the traditional "with thee", "are you" instead of the traditional "art thou" and "your womb" in place of the traditional "thy womb":

The Hail Mary is the central part of the Angelus, a devotion generally recited thrice daily by many Catholics, as well as broad & high church Anglicans, and Lutherans who usually omit the second half.

The Hail Mary is an essential element of the Rosary, a prayer method in use especially among Roman Rite (Western) Catholics. The Eastern Catholic Churches say a similar version. 

The Rosary consists traditionally of three sets of five Mysteries, each Mystery being meditated on while reciting a decade (a set of ten) of Ave Maria. The 150 Ave Maria of the Rosary thus echo the 150 psalms. These Mysteries concern events of Jesus' life during his childhood (Joyful Mysteries), Passion (Sorrowful Mysteries), and from his Resurrection onwards (Glorious Mysteries). Another set, the Luminous Mysteries, is of comparatively recent origin, having been proposed by Pope John Paul II in 2002. Each decade of Ave Maria is preceded by the Our Father (Pater Noster or The Lord's Prayer) and followed by the Glory Be (Gloria Patri) (Doxology). The repetition of the fixed-language prayers assists recitation from the heart rather than the head. Pope Paul V said that "the Rosary is a treasure of graces ... even for those souls who pray without meditating, the simple act of taking the beads in hand to pray is already a remembrance of God – of the supernatural".

Lutheran use
Martin Luther believed that Mary should be held in highest reverence, advocating the use of the first half of the Hail Mary (that is, "Hail Mary, full of grace, the Lord is with thee. Blessed art thou amongst women and blessed is the fruit of thy womb, Jesus.") as a sign of reverence for and devotion to the Virgin. The 1522  (Prayer Book) retained the Hail Mary. The second part of the prayer used in Catholicism today ("Holy Mary, Mother of God, pray for us sinners now and at the hour of our death") was not in use in Germany at the time.

Anglican use
Some Anglicans also employ the Hail Mary in devotional practice. Anglo-Catholic Anglicans use the prayer in much the same way as Roman Catholics, including use of the Rosary and the recitation of the Angelus. Many Anglican churches contain artistic depictions of the Virgin Mary, but only a minority use Marian devotional prayers such as the Hail Mary. That manifestation of veneration of Mary, decried by some Protestants as Mariolatry, was largely removed from Anglican churches during the English Reformation but was reintroduced to some extent during the Oxford Movement of the mid-1800s.

Musical settings

The Hail Mary ( in Latin) has been set to music numerous times. The title "Ave Maria" has been given also to musical compositions that are not settings of the prayer.

Although it opens with the greeting "Ave Maria" ("Hail Mary"), the text was not that of the traditional prayer, but nowadays it is commonly sung with words of the prayer. Its music was used in the final segment of Disney's Fantasia.

In Gounod's version, he superimposed melody and the words to the first prelude from Bach's The Well-Tempered Clavier, omitting only the words "Mater Dei" (Mother of God).

Anton Bruckner wrote three different settings, the best known being a motet for seven voices. Antonín Dvořák's version was composed in 1877. Another setting of Ave Maria was written by Giuseppe Verdi as part for his 1887 opera Otello. Russian composer César Cui, who was raised Roman Catholic, set the text at least three times: as the "Ave Maria", op. 34, for one or two women's voices with piano or harmonium (1886), and as part of two of his operas:  (premiered 1894) and Mateo Falcone (1907).

Settings also exist by Mozart, Liszt, Byrd, Elgar, Saint-Saëns, Rossini, Brahms, Stravinsky, Mascagni, Lauridsen, David Conte and Perosi as well as numerous versions by less well-known composers, such as J. B. Tresch, Margit Sztaray, Mme. Tarbé des Sablons, Einojuhani Rautavaara and Ninel Samokhvalova.

In the Renaissance, this text was also set by numerous composers, including Josquin des Prez, Orlando di Lasso, Tomás Luis de Victoria, and Giovanni Pierluigi da Palestrina. Before the Council of Trent there were actually different versions of the text, so the earlier composers in the period sometimes set versions of the text different from the ones shown above. Josquin des Prez, for example, himself set more than one version of the Ave Maria. Here is the text of his motet "Ave Maria ... Virgo serena", which begins with the first six words above and continues with a poem in rhymed couplets.

The much-anthologized "Ave Maria" by Jacques Arcadelt is actually a 19th-century arrangement by Pierre-Louis Dietsch, loosely based on Arcadelt's three part madrigal .

In the 20th century, Franz Biebl composed Ave Maria (Angelus Domini), actually a setting of the Angelus prayer, in which the Ave Maria is repeated three times, but its second part only once as the climax.

In Slavonic, the text was also a popular subject for setting to music by Eastern European composers. These include Rachmaninov, Stravinsky, Bortniansky, Vavilov (his version often misattributed to Caccini), Mikhail Shukh, Lyudmyla Hodzyumakha and others.

A famous setting for the Orthodox version of the prayer in Church Slavonic (Bogoroditsye Djevo) was composed by Sergei Rachmaninoff in his All-Night Vigil.

Since Protestant Christianity generally avoids any special veneration of Mary, musical settings of the prayer are sometimes sung to other texts that preserve the word boundaries and syllable stresses.

See also

 Devotion of the Three Hail Marys
 Hail Mary pass
 Marian devotions

Notes

References

External links

 University of Dayton Hail Mary in various languages
 Audio recordings and texts of the Hail Mary and other prayers in various languages
 Article 2, "THE WAY OF PRAYER", 2676–2677, on the Hail Mary—Catechism of the Catholic Church
 , video of Andy Williams' performance of a song using "Ave Maria" as its refrain.

Eastern Orthodox Mariology
Marian hymns
Rosary
Christian prayer